Dominik Plechatý (born 18 April 1999) is a Czech footballer who plays as a defender for Slovan Liberec on loan from AC Sparta Prague.

Club career

Youth level
On youth level he played for Sparta Prague he played in 3 matches in 2016–17 UEFA Youth League (against Titograd and Altınordu).

Sparta Prague
He made his debut for the first team on 10 February 2019 in the Czech First League match against Bohemians Praha 1905. He played in 5 matches in 2020–21 UEFA Europa League group stage against Lille, Milan and Celtic.

Since his first match for the first team he played in 15 league matches, in 1 Czech Cup match and in 5 UEFA Europa League matches without scoring a goal.

Vlašim (loan)
On 17 July 2018 he was loaned to Vlašim in Czech National Football League. In six months long loan he played in 14 league matches and in 3 Czech Cup matches without scoring a goal.

Jablonec (loan)
On 8 July 2019 he was loaned to Jablonec. In one year long loan he played in 26 league matches and in 2 Czech Cup matches without scoring a goal.

International career
He had played international football at under–18, 19, 20 and 21 level for Czech Republic U18, Czech Republic U19, Czech Republic U20 and Czech Republic U21. He played in 27 matches without scoring a goal.

Career statistics

Club

References

External links

1999 births
Living people
People from Prague-West District
Czech footballers
Czech Republic under-21 international footballers
Czech Republic youth international footballers
Association football defenders
Czech First League players
AC Sparta Prague players
FK Jablonec players
FK Mladá Boleslav players
FC Sellier & Bellot Vlašim players
Czech National Football League players
FC Slovan Liberec players
Sportspeople from the Central Bohemian Region